Jason Block (born December 28, 1989) is a Canadian competitive swimmer.

In 2016, he was named to Canada's Olympic team for the 2016 Summer Olympics.

References 

1989 births
Living people
Swimmers at the 2016 Summer Olympics
Canadian male swimmers
Olympic swimmers of Canada
Swimmers from Calgary
Competitors at the 2011 Summer Universiade
Competitors at the 2013 Summer Universiade